Automatic Data Processing, Inc. (ADP) is an American provider of human resources management software and services, headquartered in  Roseland, New Jersey.

History
In 1949, Henry Taub founded Automatic Payrolls, Inc. as a manual payroll processing business with his brother Joe Taub. Frank Lautenberg joined the brothers in the company's infancy. In 1957, Lautenberg, after successfully serving in sales and marketing, became a full-fledged partner with the two brothers. In 1961, the company changed its name to Automatic Data Processing, Inc. (ADP), and began using punched card machines, check printing machines, and mainframe computers.  ADP went public in 1961 with 300 clients, 125 employees, and revenues of approximately $400,000 USD. The company established a subsidiary in the United Kingdom in 1965. In 1970, Lautenberg was noted as being the president of the company. Also in 1970, the company's stock transitioned from trading on American Stock Exchange to trading on the New York Stock Exchange. It acquired the pioneering online computer services company Time Sharing Limited (TSL) in 1974 and Cyphernetics in 1975. Lautenberg continued in his roles as Chairman and CEO until elected to the United States Senate from New Jersey in 1982.

From 1985 onward, ADP’s annual revenues exceeded the $1 billion mark, with paychecks processed for about 20% of the U.S. workforce. In the 1990s, ADP began acting as a professional employer organization (PEO).  Around this time, the company acquired Autonom, a German company, and the payroll and human resource services company, GSI, headquartered in Paris. In September 1998, ADP acquired UK-based Chessington Computer Centre that supplied administration services to the UK Government.

Kerridge Computer Co. Ltd., a dealer management systems (DMS) provider to auto dealers, primarily in the UK, was acquired in 2006. In 2007, the ADP Brokerage Service Group was spun off to form Broadridge Financial Solutions, Inc. In January 2017, ADP acquired The Marcus Buckingham Company (TMBC).

In October 2017, ADP acquired Global Cash Card, a digital payments facilitator.

In January 2018, ADP acquired WorkMarket, a New York City-based software platform company that helps businesses manage freelancers, contractors, and consultants.

In 2020, ADP was ranked 227 on the Fortune 500 list of the largest United States corporations by revenue. ADP has also been included on Fortune Magazine's "World's Most Admired Companies" List for 14 consecutive years and has earned recognition from DiversityInc as one of the top companies for diversity and inclusion in the United States for 11 consecutive years.

ADP currently has about 58,000 employees worldwide and its fiscal year 2019 revenues were $14.2 billion.

Divisions and spinoffs

Broadridge Financial Solutions
In 2007, the ADP Brokerage Service Group was spun off to form Broadridge Financial Solutions, Inc., removing about $2 billion USD from ADP's total yearly revenue.  ADP distributed one share of Broadridge common stock for every four shares of ADP common stock held by shareholders of record as of the close of business on March 23, 2007.

CDK Global, LLC
Formerly called ADP Dealer Services, CDK Global was formed October 1, 2014 and provides technology services to automotive dealerships, as well as vehicle manufacturers.
In 2010, ADP acquired the automotive marketing company Cobalt.

BZ Results (Automotive Dealer Services), winner of the 2006 "Innovative Company of the Year", was purchased by ADP in 2006. At the time, BZ Results was valued at $125 million. On April 7, 2014, ADP laid off several Dealer Services associates in a reorganization and 3 days later announced plans to spin off the Dealer Services division as a standalone company. On August 19, 2014, ADP Dealer Services announced that the name of the new company, post-spinoff, would be CDK Global (an acronym for Cobalt, Dealer Services, Kerridge).

Both S&P and Moody's downgraded ADP to AA in April 2014, after the dealer services unit was spun off.

References

External links

01
Business services companies of the United States
Payroll
Companies based in Essex County, New Jersey
Roseland, New Jersey
Business services companies established in 1949
American companies established in 1949
1949 establishments in New Jersey